The fifth and final season of Ellen, an American television series, began September 24, 1997 and ended on July 22, 1998. It aired on ABC. The region 1 DVD was released on November 28, 2006. Note that although Disc 2 of the Region 1 DVD release has "The Funeral" before "Womyn Fest," the content of the next two episodes suggests that "Womyn Fest" goes before "The Funeral."

Cast

Main cast
 Ellen DeGeneres as Ellen Morgan
 Joely Fisher as Paige Clark
 David Anthony Higgins as Joe Farrell
 Clea Lewis as Audrey Penney
 Jeremy Piven as Spence Kovak

Episodes

1997 American television seasons
1998 American television seasons
Ellen (TV series) seasons